RCCX is a multiallelic copy number variation human DNA locus on chromosome 6p21.3.

Name
The RCCX abbreviation composed of the names of the genes RP (a former name for STK19 serine/threonine kinase 19), C4, CYP21 and TNX).

Structure
The number of RCCX segments varies between one and four in a chromosome, with the prevalence of approximately 15% for monomodular, 75% for bimodular, and 10% for trimodular in Europeans. The quadrimodular structure of the RCCX unit is very rare.

In a monomodular structure, all of the genes are functional i.e. protein-coding, but if a module count is two or more, there is only one copy of each functional gene rest being non-coding pseudogenes with the exception of the C4 gene which always has active copies. Each copy of the C4 gene, due to five adjacent nucleotide substitutions cause four amino acid changes and immunological subfunctionalization, can be of one of two types: C4A and C4B. Each C4 gene contains 41 exons and has a dichotomous size variation between approximately 22 kb and 16 kb, with the longer variant being the result of the integration of the endogenous retrovirus HERV-K(C4) into intron 9.

The RCCX module is the most complex gene cluster in the human genome. It is part of the major histocompatibility complex class III (MHC class III), which is the most gene-dense region of the human genome, containing many genes that yet have unknown function or structure.

References 

Chromosomes (human)
Genetics